ColossalCon, formerly called Cleveland Colossal Convention, is an annual four-day anime convention held during May/June at the Kalahari Resort and Convention Center in Sandusky, Ohio.

Programming
The convention typically offers an artist's alley, art galleries, concerts, cosplay contests, dances, flea market, formal ball, game room, game shows, guest speakers, karaoke, merchandise vendors, panels, and video rooms.

History
ColossalCon was started in 2002 and began as a one-day convention in Strongsville, Ohio. In 2003, it became a three-day convention and moved to the Holiday Inn Cleveland South Independence in Independence, Ohio where it remained until 2007, except for 2005 when it was located in the Embassy Suites. The convention for 2008 moved to the Hilton Cleveland East / Beachwood in Beachwood, Ohio, and moved again in 2009 to the Kalahari Resort and Convention Center in Sandusky, Ohio where the convention has been located since. During the 2010 convention a tornado hit the area surrounding the venue, hotel and convention guests were sent to the basement for shelter, and the venue suffered no damage. The convention is considering an attendance cap due outgrowing Sandusky's hotel room capacity. In 2017, the water-park remained open extra hours for the convention. Nostalgiaconventions.com LLC (ColossalCon) filed a complaint against Colossus Con in 2017 for using a name too close to ColossalCon.

ColossalCon 2020 was moved from June to September due to the COVID-19 pandemic, but was later cancelled. The convention had an attendance cap of 7,000 in 2021.

Event history

Fan Appreciation Party Weekend
Fan Appreciation Party Weekend was a two-day convention held during September at the Kalahari Resort and Convention Center in Sandusky, Ohio.

Event history

Colossalcon East
Colossalcon East is a three-day anime convention held during September at the Kalahari Resorts in Pocono Manor, Pennsylvania. The convention is known for being located at a water park.

The space the convention used in 2018 was small and issues with cosplay in the water park occurred on Sunday. Colossalcon East 2020 was cancelled due to the COVID-19 pandemic.

Event history

Colossalcon Texas
Colossalcon Texas is a three-day convention held during August at the Kalahari Resorts Texas in Round Rock, Texas.

Event history

Colossalcon North
Colossalcon North is a three-day convention held during November at the Kalahari Resorts Dells in Wisconsin Dells, Wisconsin.

Event history

References

External links
ColossalCon Website
ColossalCon East Website
ColossalCon Texas Website
ColossalCon North Website

Anime conventions in the United States
Recurring events established in 2002
2002 establishments in Ohio
Annual events in Ohio
Festivals in Ohio
Tourist attractions in Erie County, Ohio
Conventions in Ohio